Micromonospora parathelypteridis is a bacterium from the genus Micromonospora which has been isolated from the roots of the plant Parathelypteris beddomei in Harbin, China. Micromonospora parathelypteridis has antifungal activity

References

External links
Type strain of Micromonospora parathelypteridis at BacDive -  the Bacterial Diversity Metadatabase

 

Micromonosporaceae
Bacteria described in 2017